Franklin Township is a township in Jackson County, Kansas, USA.  As of the 2000 census, its population was 776. The southwesternmost part of the township is located within the Prairie Band Potawatomi Indian Reservation.

History
Franklin Township was formed in 1856. It was named for Ben Franklin.

Geography
Franklin Township covers an area of 33.43 square miles (86.57 square kilometers); of this, 1.1 square miles (2.84 square kilometers) or 3.28 percent is water. The stream of Banner Creek runs through this township.

Unincorporated towns
 Birmingham
(This list is based on USGS data and may include former settlements.)

Adjacent townships
 Liberty Township (north)
 Straight Creek Township (northeast)
 Garfield Township (east)
 Cedar Township (southeast)
 Lincoln Township (southwest)
 Banner Township (west)
 Jefferson Township (northwest)

Cemeteries
The township contains two cemeteries: Bruck and Holton.

Major highways
 U.S. Route 75
 K-16
 K-116

References
 U.S. Board on Geographic Names (GNIS)
 United States Census Bureau cartographic boundary files

External links
 US-Counties.com
 City-Data.com

Townships in Jackson County, Kansas
Townships in Kansas